The Yekaterinburg Metro is a rapid transit system that serves the city of Yekaterinburg, Russia. The Yekaterinburg Metro is the 13th and last metro to open in the USSR.

History

Yekaterinburg, formerly called Sverdlovsk, was always known as the informal capital of the Urals, a natural divide between Europe and Asia, between European Russia and Siberia. The city grew very rapidly because it was an important industrial centre and a transport hub. Plans for a rapid-transit system began in the late 1970s, and in 1980 construction began.

The city's uneven landscape, as well as its layout with a very dense city centre, prompted to combine deep and shallow stations. On 26 April 1991, the sixth Metro of Russia and the thirteenth and last Metro of the Soviet Union, which ceased to exist only a few months later, was finally opened to the public. The economic crisis of the early 1990s rocked the Metro very hard and the first stage comprised only three stations. However, then-president Boris Yeltsin diverted state funds to complete its construction and by 1995 the Metro was doubled in length. Since then, only two extensions have been built.

Timeline

Operation
The Metro is a typical Soviet design, which when completed will form a triangle from three lines intersecting in the city centre. The eight stations comprise  of length and are split between deep and shallow. Of the latter, four are pillar-trispans and one is a single vault (built to Kharkov technology). The deep-level stations include one pylon, one column and two Leningrad-technology single vaults, although one was built to a design making it appear as a single deck. Like all ex-Soviet Metros, the stations are elaborately decorated, although economic hardships prevented the full original designs from being implemented.

The Metro is served by one depot, Kalinovskoye, and 62 cars are assigned to it, even though the depot is counted for 70 cars. Most trains are of types 81-717.5/714.5, built by MMZ (Metrovagonmash) and LVZ (Factory of Egorov in Saint Petersburg) during the late 1980s and early 1990s. The metro is also serving 81-717.5M/714.5M which is a variant of 81-717.5/714.5. Since 2019, the metro is serving two new four carriage train sets of type 81-717.6/714.6 which are a lot more comfortable and advanced. Currently, the oldest carriages are being refurbished in order to extend their service limit to more 15 years. 

Ridership has improved in recent years. In 2011, the average daily ridership on the Metro was 105,000. By 2012, the average daily ridership had increased to 130,000. This corresponds to an annual ridership in 2012 of approximately 47.45 million people.

Plans
The construction of the Bazhovskaya station which should be between the "Geologicheskaya" and "Chkalovskaya" has been postponed indefinitely.

The first section of the second line with length of 4.5 km should have four stations: "Metallurgicheskaya", "Tatishchyevskaya", "Ploshchad Kommunarov" and "Ploshchad 1905 Goda". Station "Tatishchyevskaya" and "Ploshchad Kommunarov" will be near Central Stadium, which hosted the FIFA World Cup 2018 matches. The opening was originally planned for 2018. However, only pre-development was finished in 2013 and the design competition had not been declared, the construction was delayed, and the 2018 opening was not feasible.

Map

Gallery

See also
 List of metro systems

References

External links

Yekaterinburg at UrbanRail.net
 The most full information about Yekaterinburg metro
 Popular site
 Metroworld
 Metrosoyuza
 List, maps and stations of Yekaterinburg metro
 metro-ektb.ru

 
Underground rapid transit in Russia
Buildings and structures in Yekaterinburg
Buildings and structures built in the Soviet Union
Railway lines opened in 1991
1991 establishments in Russia